Børre Næss (born 23 January 1982 in Kongsberg) is a Norwegian cross-country skier who competed between 2002 and 2014. He has three World Cup victories, all in individual sprint events (2005: Finland, 2007: Norway, 2008: Canada).

Cross-country skiing results
All results are sourced from the International Ski Federation (FIS).

World Cup

Season standings

Individual podiums
 3 victories – (3 ) 
 9 podiums – (9 )

Team podiums
 1 podium – (1 )

References

External links

1982 births
Living people
Norwegian male cross-country skiers
People from Kongsberg
Sportspeople from Viken (county)